Vierra is a surname. Notable people with the surname include:

Benedict M. Vierra (died 1994), American Roman Catholic priest
Carlos Vierra (1876–1937), American painter, illustrator and photographer
Feliciano Vierra Tavares (1920–2008), American musician and singer
Ryan Vierra (born 1968), American Highland games competitor
Ross Vierra (Born 1978), Military Officer, Business leader and philanthropist